Mae Sun is a tambon (subdistrict) of Fang District, in Chiang Mai Province, Thailand. In 2005 it had a population of 15,019 people. The tambon contains 17 villages.

References

Tambon of Chiang Mai province
Populated places in Chiang Mai province